Hawthorne Circle was a large traffic circle connecting two major state highways located in Hawthorne, New York, United States, which carried over 67,000 cars daily at its peak.  Opened in 1931 to join the Taconic and Saw Mill River parkways, it was replaced in 1971 with a three-level interchange.  A  segment of the Taconic continued on to connect to the Bronx River Parkway, adding to the area's congestion. 

The Sprain Brook Parkway, the northern terminus of which lies just south of the circle, was not completed until 1980.

References

External links

 1938 USGS Map of the original Hawthorne Circle. (link no longer works)

Roundabouts and traffic circles in the United States
Transportation in Westchester County, New York
1931 establishments in New York (state)
1971 disestablishments in New York (state)